Eternity is a fictional cosmic entity appearing in American comic books published by Marvel Comics. Created by scripter-editor Stan Lee and artist-plotter Steve Ditko, the character is first mentioned in Strange Tales #134 (July 1965) and first appears in Strange Tales #138 (Nov. 1965).

Debuting in the Silver Age of Comic Books, the character has appeared in five decades of Marvel continuity and appeared in associated Marvel merchandise including animated television series, films, trading cards, and video games.

Eternity appeared in the Marvel Cinematic Universe film Thor: Love and Thunder (2022).

Publication history
Eternity debuted in an epic 17-issue storyline dubbed "The Eternity Saga", which occurred in the ongoing feature "Doctor Strange" in Strange Tales #130–146 (March 1965–July 1966). The character was first mentioned in the 10-page story "Earth Be My Battleground" in Strange Tales #134 (July 1965), and first seen in the 10-page story "If Eternity Should Fail" in Strange Tales #138 (Nov. 1965).

Following the publication's retitling as Doctor Strange, the character returned in issues #180–182 (May–July 1969), and thereafter continued to appear in stories that were cosmic in scope, including in Doctor Strange vol. 2 #10–13 (Oct. 1974–April 1975); The Defenders #92 (Feb. 1981); and a story by writer-artist John Byrne in Fantastic Four #262 (Jan. 1984) that attracted controversy. At the conclusion of that story, Eternity validated the existence of another cosmic character, Galactus. Howard University Professor of Literature Marc Singer stated Byrne used the character Eternity as a means to "justify planetary-scale genocide".

Eternity guest starred in Secret Wars II #6–7 (Dec. 1984–Jan. 1985); Silver Surfer vol. 3 #6 & 10 (Dec. 1987, April 1988) and with Marvel's cosmic hierarchy in the limited series The Infinity Gauntlet #1–6 (July–Dec. 1991), and in its sequel, The Infinity War #1–6 (June–Nov. 1992). The character played a pivotal role in limited series Avengers Infinity #1–4 (Sept.–Dec. 2000).  Major revelations about the character appeared in a storyline in Quasar #19–25 (Feb.–Aug. 1991). Other appearances, again in storylines that featured a cosmic theme, included Infinity Abyss #1–6 (Aug.–Oct. 2002); and Defenders vol. 3, #1–5 (Sept. 2005–Jan. 2006).

Eternity has also appeared in the alternate universe titles What If? #32 (April 1982), Marvel: The End #1–6 (May 2003–Aug. 2003), and JLA/Avengers #1–4 (Sept. 2003–May 2004). Eternity's origin, along with the birth of the Marvel Multiverse, was finally revealed in The Ultimates 2 #6 (2017). He returned in 2019's Doctor Strange story arc "Herald Supreme".

Fictional character biography
Eternity, along with his sister Infinity, were born with the Big Bang and they represent the multiverse in its current iteration (but each universe has its own Eternity and Infinity that represent that universe). Before Eternity, there was a single universe, whose animating force was the primal cosmic being that would later call itself the First Firmament. The First Firmament was attacked by its creations, The Celestials, during the catastrophic cosmic war that erupted between them and their counterpart creations, the Aspirants. The climax of that war resulted in the Celestials' weapons tearing the first universe apart. The core essence of the First Firmament and the surviving Aspirants desperately fled to the void outside creation. The torn fragments of the sundered first universe then coalesced into a new being that was made up of hundreds of universes: the "Second Cosmos" which was the first multiverse. Creation would then evolve, die and be reborn six more times, each time evolving and changing to add new realities, forces and properties to itself-and all these changes would be reflected in the corresponding birth of Eternity. After the destruction of the multiverse by the incursions and its rebirth at the hands of Reed Richards, Franklin Richards, and Molecule Man, Eternity is in his 8th incarnation.

The first recorded human contact with Eternity is by Doctor Strange, who seeks the entity out when his master the Ancient One is attacked by former pupil Baron Mordo. After a series of battles with Mordo and his minions, and discovering that arch-foe Dormammu is secretly backing Mordo, Strange finds and speaks with Eternity. The entity advises Strange that he is capable of defeating his foes without aid, and Strange wins a duel with Dormammu (who is ultimately defeated by Eternity) and thwarts an attempted sabotage in his Sanctum Sanctorum.

On New Year's Eve, the entity is kidnapped by Doctor Strange's foe Nightmare, who after causing time distortions that allow beings such as dinosaurs and barbarians to appear in New York City, appears before Strange and his aide and sometime lover Clea. Nightmare challenges the mystic to attempt to rescue Eternity, and after accepting, Strange enters Nightmare's Dream World. After an extended series of battles and a temporary defeat, Strange successfully recruits the X-Men foe the Juggernaut to stop Nightmare from merging his realm with Earth, and together they free Eternity. The entity then banishes Nightmare while Doctor Strange and the Juggernaut restore reality.

The entity is aided by superhero team the Defenders, who locate three missing fragments of its being and convince them to rejoin with Eternity.

Eternity is also summoned to the trial of Fantastic Four member Mister Fantastic, who is accused of saving the life of fellow cosmic entity Galactus. Eternity allows all present to momentarily possess "cosmic awareness", thereby allowing them to understand that Galactus is a vital part of the universe, despite the continued extinction of entire species.

During a series of extended battles between cosmic hero Quasar and the villain Maelstrom (the avatar of the entity Oblivion), Eternity is revealed to have a "twin" entity, Infinity, with the pair representing the space-time continuum and the living force of the universe.

The character appears with the entire cosmic hierarchy (eventually revealed to be "retconned" into an avatar of the entity) during an encounter with the entity the Beyonder and consults with fellow entity Galactus when the Elders of the Universe plan to destroy the latter (to initiate a new Big Bang and restart the universe).

Abraxas was imprisoned inside Eternity and was released when Galactus died.

Together with the cosmic hierarchy Eternity opposes the Eternal Thanos when the villain wields the Infinity Gauntlet, although they are all eventually defeated. Once Thanos is eventually dispatched (courtesy of his own carelessness), Eternity unsuccessfully advises fellow cosmic entity the Living Tribunal against allowing the Infinity Gems to be used in conjunction. Eternity develops animosity towards the artificial being Adam Warlock, whom the entity encounters on several occasions.

Eternity also "spawned" several "children", or concepts that became separate, independent entities: Empathy; Eulogy; Expediency; Entropy; Epiphany; Enmity and Eon (Eon is eventually killed and replaced in turn by the concept Epoch).

Eternity is imprisoned by the Magus (the evil alter ego of Adam Warlock) who attempts to reunite the Infinity Gems for his own use. The villain is eventually defeated when Eternity merges with Infinity and together they strip the Magus of his newfound power.

Eternity is also summoned by the superhero team the Avengers to reason with the cosmic entities the Infinites and observes the attempts of Thanos and several of Earth's heroes to defeat several of his clones, who are dedicated to destroying the universe and in turn, Eternity itself.

Eternity is eventually killed due to the machinations of his son Entropy, when the later allied himself with Genis-Vell, who at the time was becoming insane under the strain of his cosmic awareness. Entropy soon regretted what he had done, when all of creation was destroyed, leaving only himself, his sister Epiphany, Genis and Rick Jones, since the prospect of spending the rest of eternity in an empty void was not all that alluring. Rick Jones suggested that he try creating something. Entropy did, and with Genis-Vell's help, he re-created the Universe, thus becoming the new Eternity. As Eternity, he revealed that this was all part of his life cycle.

Eternity is one of the last beings (together with the Living Tribunal and Infinity) to be overcome by Thanos when he uses the artifact the Heart of the Universe to undo the universe and then remake it minus a fatal flaw. During JLA/Avengers he met Kismet and the two fell in love. They are then kidnapped by the villain Krona when the Grandmaster engineers a merging of the Marvel Universe and the DC Universe, who use their connections to their universes in an attempt to destroy both so he can learn their secrets. After the Crisis was averted due to the Avengers and Justice League joining forces and defeating Krona, the two sadly parted ways.<ref>JLA/Avengers #1 (Sept. 2003) & 3 (Dec. 2003); Avengers/JLA #2 (Oct. 2003) & 4 (May 2004)</ref>

The entity's power is stolen by Dormammu and his sister Umar to remake the universe in their image. The pair are opposed by a reuniting of three of the original Defenders (Strange; the Hulk and Namor the Sub-Mariner), with Umar betraying Dormammu and then being defeated in turn. Eternity's power returns to him and reality is restored.

When an alien race's experiments in eternal universal observation cause damage to Eternity, he is narrowly saved by the actions of the Fantastic Four, Doctor Strange, Black Panther, Storm, Gravity and the Silver Surfer. Strange uses Gravity as a "scalpel" based on his gravity-wielding powers to cut out the damaged portions while Storm serves as a temporary host to Eternity's consciousness as the other heroes hold back the universe's "antibodies" as they try to attack the perceived cause of the damage.

In the "Dark Reign" storyline, Eternity grants Henry Pym the title of Scientist Supreme, a scientific counterpart to the mystical title Sorcerer Supreme, as he is able to create science with effects similar to magic. However, Loki later claims to have been posing as Eternity in order to trick Pym.

During the Chaos War storyline, Eternity is summoned by Hercules to deal with Amatsu-Mikaboshi. However, Eternity tells Hercules that fighting the Chaos God will be like fighting an aspect of Eternity himself. Eternity remains confident that Hercules and his comrades will find a way to win.

During the Time Runs Out storyline, the Beyonders are revealed to have killed Eternity as part of destroying abstract entities in each reality across the multiverse.

Doctor Doom's killing of the Beyonders and use of their power to create Battleworld out of what remains of the multiverse revives Eternity, whose face and voice are replaced by Doom's. Glorian informs the Silver Surfer that reality being held together by Doom's will has turned Eternity into the will of Doom.

At the end of the Civil War II story line, Eternity appears before Ulysses when he evolves into a new being and becomes one with the universe.

The cosmic team The Ultimates traveled Outside of the Multiverse to survey the timestream to evaluate its status after the rebirth of reality during the Secret Wars event. The forces outside Reality proved to be too great a challenge even for the immensely powerful and skilled super-team. They were rescued by Galactus The Lifebringer, whom the Ultimates had earlier cured of his hunger and transformed into a positive cosmic force, much to the former Devourer's gratitude. An aspect of Eternity had informed Galactus of their danger and requested he assist them. However, after rescuing the Ultimates, Galactus discovered to his horror that the actual totality of Eternity - the actual life force of the Multiverse rather than the aspects of him that usually interact with lesser beings - had been chained and imprisoned by some mysterious cosmic force. Eternity had used the rescue of the Ultimates as an excuse to lure Galactus there to warn him of his predicament and that all of Creation was in danger from his jailer.

It was eventually revealed Eternity's jailer was none other than his predecessor, The First Firmament. The destruction of the Seventh and the rebirth of the Eighth Multiverse by the Beyonders during the Secret Wars had an unforeseen consequence: It provided an opening for the Firmament, who had been patiently waiting Outside, to attack the newly reborn and therefore greatly weakened Eternity with the goal of destroying the multiverse and restoring itself to the center of creation. The Firmament first chained and then began infiltrating Eternity with both its loyal Aspirant agents and taking control over the lesser cosmic entities that protected the cosmic balance in its component universes. For example, under the Firmament's influence, Master Order and Lord Chaos destroyed the reborn Living Tribunal in front of Galactus the Lifebringer and then found their servant, The In-Betweener and forcibly merged into a new cosmic being many orders of magnitude of power greater that called itself Logos. Logos then located the surviving Celestials and destroyed all but one of them. One of the Celestials was rescued by The Queen of Nevers. Logos then transformed Galactus back into the Devourer of Worlds, with an enormously increased hunger. The goal was to turn Galactus into a living weapon that would devour the Multiverse. Galactus was rescued again by the Ultimates and his current herald, the Anti-Man-who sacrificed his life to restore Galactus as the Lifebringer. Enraged, Galactus devoured Rostov, the Firmament's servant who had infiltrated the Troubleshooters and attempted to manipulate them into defeating the Ultimates. After devouring him, Galactus knew all Rostov knew. However, Galactus was now weakened and had to have time to recover before planning their next move. Eternity remained chained with the First Firmament acting against the newly reborn and therefore malleable Cosmic Order within him. Galactus swore to free him by any means necessary and the Ultimates agreed to help.

Eternity Mask
A black magical item created from Eternity's own substance during the sixth century by a group of renegade occultists to give whoever wears it equal power to anyone they may face, unless they are below the natural ability of the mask's user. This allowed for example, an untrained peasant to be on equal grounds with the Black Knight and fight him for three days straight. If the would-be user's intent was to commit acts of evil, the mask had no effect on them. So far the upper limits of this ability have yet to be established. The Mask has since then, been passed on from individual to individual and has been implied to have taken a role in the most important events in Human history. One of the first known users of the mask was Jim Gardley a.k.a. Masked Raider. Other users were the Black Rider, the Ferret, Thunderer and Jerome Hamilton a.k.a. Blind Justice.

Powers and abilities
Eternity is a tremendously powerful abstract entity. An embodiment of the multiverse, it has no real physical body. The entity can manipulate the multiverse to achieve essentially any desired effect, and as its name suggests, it is immortal and unaffected by the passage of time. Eternity can warp space and matter into a manifestation that can be perceived by lesser beings, or form avatars from another plane of existence known as the Dimension of Manifestations. On occasion it manifests by possessing the body of exceptionally spiritually-strong mortal beings (e.g. Doctor Strange, Thor, Storm).

Thanos, wielding the Infinity Gauntlet, ranked Eternity's scale of power as above that of Lord Chaos and Master Order, equal to that of Infinity, but below that of the Living Tribunal.

Reception

 Accolades 

 In 2014, Comicbook.com ranked Eternity's introduction 56th in their "75 Most Iconic Marvel Comics Moments" list.
 In 2017, Den of Geek ranked Eternity 34th in their "Guardians of the Galaxy 3: 50 Marvel Characters We Want to See" list.
 In 2018, CBR.com ranked Eternity 2nd in their "Stan Lee's 20 Most Powerful Creations" list.
 In 2018, Screen Rant ranked Eternity 17th in their "Marvel Vs DC: The 25 Most Powerful Gods " list.
 In 2020, CBR.com ranked Eternity 1st in their "Marvel's 10 Most Powerful Giants" list and 6th in their "19 Most Powerful Cosmic Marvel Characters" list.
 In 2022, Collider ranked Eternity 4th in their "19 Most Powerful Marvel Characters" list.
 In 2022, Screen Rant ranked Eternity 3rd in their "16 Most Powerful Cosmic Characters In Marvel Comics" list.
 In 2022, The Mary Sue ranked Eternity 5th in their "10 Most Powerful Marvel Characters of All Time" list.

 Impact 
"The Eternity Saga" culminates in the introduction of the character Eternity. The saga is frequently cited on lists of the top Doctor Strange storylines to read, being called "Lee and Ditko’s magnum opus of oddity." In 2017, CBR.com highlighted the surreal and trippy imagery attributed to the emergence of Eternity himself and his battle with Dormammu, when it was rated one of Marvel's top cosmic/space stories and voted 89th in the top 100 comic book storylines.

Eternity possibly served as inspiration for Marvel writers Jim Starlin and Steve Englehart.Bell, B. (2008). Strange and Stranger: The World of Steve Ditko. Fantagraphics Books.

Other versions

 Heroes Reborn 
In an alternate reality depicted in the "Heroes Reborn" miniseries, the Blur encounters and races Eternity.

In other media
Television
 Eternity makes a cameo appearance in the X-Men episode "Dark Phoenix".
 Eternity appears in Silver Surfer, voiced by John Neville. This version is explicitly referred to as male, serves as an observer, and is the brother of Infinity.

Film
Eternity appears in films set in the Marvel Cinematic Universe (MCU) in varying forms.
 The entity's likeness is depicted in Guardians of the Galaxy within temple murals dedicated to it and others like it.
 Eternity appears in Thor: Love and Thunder''. Gorr the God Butcher reaches Eternity's realm using Thor's axe Stormbreaker to wish for the death of all gods. However, Thor convinces Gorr to use his wish to resurrect his daughter Love instead.

Merchandise
A bust of Eternity was released by Bowen Designs and designed by the Kucharek brothers.

See also
 Captain Universe

References

External links
 Eternity at Marvel.com
 
 The Unofficial Handbook of Marvel Comics Creators

Characters created by Stan Lee
Characters created by Steve Ditko
Comics characters introduced in 1965
Marvel Comics abstract concepts